Ulli Kampelmann is a professional artist from Germany, currently based in Florida. Ulli develops innovative means and ways to bring images from the inner world into being. She gathers wavelengths of color, shape and light and conveys them into an art work to provide a hint toward of a condition, a mood, a story.

Early life 

Ulli is the fifth of six children born to Wilhelm Heinrich Kampelmann and Elsa (née Pilz) in Halle (Saale), Sachsen Anhalt, East Germany.

She was drawn to the arts from an early age.

She attended university in Halle where she earned her Master of Education degree and went on to study Educational Philosophy at Technische Universität Berlin.

In 1975 she successfully escaped to West Berlin in the trunk of a friend's car.

Artistic career 

Her art forms use light as an essential element though time and/or water are also incorporated. Consistently her works express the feeling to push ahead and think forward. She opened her first art studio in Stuttgart in 1980.
 "I am always extremely interested to see Ulli Kampelmann's art. When I saw her work for the first time I was very surprised at how extraordinary, how innovative this art is to see. I have been looking for very long time to find something truly new in modern art. I found it here:Aesthetic and Beauty. So much new compared to what we normally see. I believe it is an adventure to be with this art. The translation of the word "Adventure" means you may be uncertain where you arrive. I think this is the invention of Ulli Kampelmann, to attract attention to one point, get the audience in communication with the art and then leave them alone to enjoy their trip through this adventure. Perhaps and this it the beauty of it; you immediately feel that Ulli Kampelmann has the intention to raise this question: What is beauty and harmony?." Rudolf Greiner - Art Historian & Gallerist.
 "The artist brings the sky into the room. Kampelmann's artwork in this clubhouse inspires enthusiasm and adds power to the sport, it's create a game of emotion." Edeltraud Groz - Art historian and Gallerist.

Besides her works in private collections, the following is a partial list of where Ulli Kampelmann's artworks can be found:
Karlsruhe Vierordtbad
Corporate Express, Stuttgart
Golf club house at Domäne Niederreutin owned by Carl, Duke of Württemberg
Mercedes-Benz showroom in Stuttgart.
Fernsehturm Berlin (TV Tower Berlin)
Landesbank Baden-Württemberg, Präsidialbüro
Klinik Tannheim
Banks in Karlsruhe, Berghausen, Söllingen and Ditzingen 
Krematorium Karlsruhe
Cafe Krone, Karlsruhe
HQ Drees & Sommer
Klinik Königstein
Schloss Liebenstein
Sammlung Staatsgalerie Stuttgart

Some of her exhibitions:
Drees & Sommer Project Management headquarters
Mercedes Benz headquarters in cooperation with the Stuttgart 21 project
Stuttgart Airport
Central Bank Karlsruhe
Landtag of Baden-Württemberg
Schloss Hohenheim
Clearwater, Florida.
80 für 80 in the "Kunsthaus" (Art House) of Achim Freyer in Berlin.

Filmmaker 

While in Stuttgart, Ulli Kampelmann was commissioned by the Mercedes Benz company to create large artworks for their headquarters. In order to research ideas for one of the commissions, she was given access to the Mercedes Benz/Daimler AG corporate archives where she came across the little-known details of the invention of the automobile by Carl Benz in 1885 as well as the charming story of the first ever long distance road trip by Carl's wife Bertha. Once Ulli was in the USA she wished to present this story to Americans. She wrote the screenplay for and directed an educational documentary titled The Car is Born - a documentary about Carl and Bertha Benz. She and her husband, a videographer, entered this documentary into a few film festivals and it won a "Best of the Fest" award in 2011.

A documentary detailing her own personal experiences growing up in and eventually escaping from East Germany called That Damned Wall, is in post-production.

Author 

For schools, she wrote "the Complete Visual Arts Education". (as mentioned above in Educator section)

Ulli was a contributing author for Imago Magazine for six months with her article titled Ulli on Art.

For The Star, the magazine of the Mercedes Benz Club of America, Ulli wrote an article about the first ever long-distance road-trip in an automobile in 1888, which was made by a woman, Bertha Benz, wife of Carl Benz, inventor of the automobile.

She authored a full length screenplay detailing the circumstances surrounding her life in and her three successful escapes from East Germany.

Educator 

Ulli Kampelmann as a Master of Education, was invited to give art seminars and to publish educational articles about art and art history in various magazines.

After she opened her art studio in the USA, she was commissioned to write a complete visual arts curriculum for schools K-12. This curriculum is currently implemented into a few schools in the USA and Australia. She continued to write educational articles about public art and was commissioned to provide continuing education for architects in the field of public arts projects. Most recently she took up the production of educational films and documentaries.

An underlying theme in many of her works is her sensitivity for human rights, specifically one's freedom of expression and right to a good education.

In May 2014, Ms. Kampelmann conceived of Kampelmann Academy and with the technical skills of her husband Steve Van Stone, the concept was developed to be an online, video-based education site offering aesthetic tutorials to bring about full conceptual understanding of a subject with concurrent facility in application of that subject in life. The online academy will contain curricula from kindergarten through high school as well as some college level courses.

In early 2016, Kampelmann Academy was expanded in order to oversee humanitarian educational projects as well. Kampelmann Academy, Inc, a non-profit, tax-exempt organization was established. Its first order of business was to build a free, online language course called Say Hello! to teach German to the refugees pouring into central Europe. The videos of the language lessons are subtitled in Arabic, English, Persian, Kurmanji and Sorani for the benefit of the refugees from Syria, Iraq, Kurdistan, Afghanistan, Iran, Palestine and elsewhere.

External links 
 Website of Kampelmann Academy - Education project
 Website of the Kampelmann Academy non-profit organization
 Website of the Free German language course for refugees
 Official website of Ulli Kampelmann's artworks
 Online Art gallery established 2013 to host exceptional artists from around the world - from Internet Archive
 Official website of Ulli Kampelmann's film projects
 Website for the documentary about life behind the Iron Curtain
 Website for the documentary about Carl and Bertha Benz - the Car is Born
 Ulli Kampelmann Blog

References 

Living people
German educational theorists
American designers
German designers
German emigrants to the United States
Year of birth missing (living people)